Leandro do Bonfim  (born January 8, 1984 in Salvador), is a Brazilian attacking midfielder.

Honours
Dutch League: 2003
Dutch Super Cup: 2003
Copa Libertadores: 2005
Minas Gerais State League: 2006

References

External links
 zerozero.pt
 sambafoot
 CBF
 Guardian Stats Centre
 netvasco

1984 births
Living people
Brazilian footballers
Brazilian expatriate footballers
Esporte Clube Vitória players
PSV Eindhoven players
FC Porto players
São Paulo FC players
Cruzeiro Esporte Clube players
C.D. Nacional players
CR Vasco da Gama players
Fluminense FC players
Desportivo Brasil players
Esporte Clube Bahia players
Avaí FC players
Audax Rio de Janeiro Esporte Clube players
Ittihad FC players
Al-Wehda Club (Mecca) players
Eredivisie players
Primeira Liga players
Saudi Professional League players
Saudi First Division League players
Expatriate footballers in the Netherlands
Expatriate footballers in Portugal
Expatriate footballers in Saudi Arabia
Association football midfielders
Sportspeople from Salvador, Bahia